Tacuarembó is a toponym of Guaraní origin, meaning "river of the reeds". It may refer to:
 Tacuarembó, a city in Uruguay
 Tacuarembó Department, a political division of Uruguay
 Tacuarembó River, a watercourse in Uruguay
 Roman Catholic Diocese of Tacuarembó, Uruguay
 Tacuarembó Fútbol Club, a Uruguayan soccer club based in Tacuarembó
 Battle of Tacuarembó (1820), an episode of the Portuguese conquest of the Banda Oriental